The following is a list of fictional astronauts as imagined before the Space Age. The astronauts on this list appear in stories released prior to or shortly after the inception of Project Mercury in 1958.

Early period

Notes

References

Lists of fictional astronauts